The El Jobean Post Office and General Store is a historic combined store and post office in El Jobean, Florida, United States. It is located at 4370 Garden Road. It was added to the National Register of Historic Places in 1999.

Gallery

See also 
List of United States post offices

References and external links 

 Charlotte County listings at National Register of Historic Places
 El Jobean Post Office and General Store at Florida's Office of Cultural and Historical Programs

National Register of Historic Places in Charlotte County, Florida